Charles George Percy Delacourt-Smith, Baron Delacourt-Smith  (25 April 1917 – 2 August 1972) was a British trade unionist and Labour Party politician.

Background and education
Born in Windsor and named after his father, he was the only son of Charles Smith and his wife Ethel. He was educated at Windsor Grammar School and went then to Wadham College, Oxford, graduating with a Master of Arts At Oxford he was elected Librarian of the Oxford Union.

Working life
After university, he became employed at the New Fabian Research Bureau as a research assistant. In 1939, he came to the Civil Service Clerical Association and was an assistant secretary until 1953. Subsequently, he joined the Post Office Engineering Union, serving as its general secretary 1967. In 1960, he was nominated a justice of the peace, assigned to the County of London.

Political career
Following the outbreak of the Second World War, Delacourt-Smith entered the Royal Engineers in July 1940. He was commissioned in January 1943 and was transferred to the Royal Army Service Corps, where he was promoted to captain and was mentioned in despatches. After the end of the war Delacourt-Smith was admitted to the British House of Commons in 1945, having been elected for Colchester. He represented the constituency until 1950 and during this time was Parliamentary Private Secretary to Philip Noel-Baker in the latter's capacity as Secretary of State for Commonwealth Relations. In 1947, he was chosen as an executive member of Labour's Research Department, a position he held for the next four years.

Delacourt-Smith was created a life peer as Baron Delacourt-Smith, of New Windsor, in the Royal County of Berkshire in 1967 and thus was enabled to a seat in the House of Lords. Two years later he was appointed Minister of State for Technology and on this occasion sworn of the Privy Council. In 1970, when the Conservative Party took office he was replaced as Minister.

Personal life
In 1939, he married Margaret, the daughter of Frederick Hando. They both had one son and two daughters. Together with his wife and younger daughter, he assumed the additional surname Delacourt by a deed poll in 1967. He died, aged 55, at the Westminster Hospital, London in 1972, after suffering a stroke while making a speech in the House of Lords, being survived by his wife. Two years after his death she received a life peerage in her own right.

Works
Democratic Sweden (1938), Smith, G. and Cole, M. (eds), Routledge
Britain's Food Supplies in Peace and War (1940), Smith, C., Routledge
Modern Turkey (1940), Parker, J. and Smith, C., Routledge

Notes

References

External links

1917 births
1972 deaths
Alumni of Wadham College, Oxford
British Army personnel of World War II
General Secretaries of the Post Office Engineering Union
Labour Party (UK) life peers
British trade union leaders
Members of the Fabian Society
Members of the Privy Council of the United Kingdom
Members of the Parliament of the United Kingdom for English constituencies
Ministers in the Wilson governments, 1964–1970
Royal Army Service Corps officers
Royal Engineers soldiers
Spouses of life peers
UK MPs 1945–1950
UK MPs who were granted peerages
Life peers created by Elizabeth II